Grace Episcopal Church Complex is a historic Episcopal church complex located at Lyons in Wayne County, New York.  The complex consists of a contributing stone church building begun in 1838, a contributing frame rectory begun about 1833, and a contributing parish house built in 1887–1888.  The church building is Gothic Revival in style and constructed of rubble limestone walls with cut limestone trim.  The rectory is an irregularly massed two story, wood-frame building incorporating a former private residence built at this site about 1833 in the vernacular late Federal / early Greek Revival style.  The parish house is a single story, frame building designed in the Queen Anne style.

It was listed on the National Register of Historic Places in 1994.

References

Churches on the National Register of Historic Places in New York (state)
Episcopal church buildings in New York (state)
Queen Anne architecture in New York (state)
Gothic Revival church buildings in New York (state)
Churches completed in 1840
Churches in Wayne County, New York
19th-century Episcopal church buildings
National Register of Historic Places in Wayne County, New York